Kim Kyui-Hwan (born 28 February 1948) is a South Korean former volleyball player who competed in the 1972 Summer Olympics.

References

1948 births
Living people
South Korean men's volleyball players
Olympic volleyball players of South Korea
Volleyball players at the 1972 Summer Olympics
20th-century South Korean people